Megaphorb is an area with communities of tall, exuberant, perennial herbs. The plant communities provide ground cover and often exist on the margins of wooded areas or forests or terrain that has recently been cleared. This type of vegetation also occurs near disturbed areas such as adjacent to creeks or rivers. These plant communities are often found in mountainous areas.

References

Ecology